The National Asians High School Debate Championship, more popularly known as NAsHDC, is a debate tournament in the Philippines sponsored by the De La Salle University-Manila.  It is one of two national debate tournaments in the Philippines, the other being the Philippine Schools Debate Championship sponsored by the Ateneo de Manila University.

Every year after its inception in 2003, NAsHDC has consistently expanded in participation and support. Former partners include the Children's Museum and Library Incorporated (CMLI) and the Friedrich Naumann Stiftung (FNS). The tournament is also consistently supported by the National Youth Commission (NYC) and endorsed by the Department of Education.  In 2008, the tournament was renamed the Manila Bulletin National Asians High School Debate Championship in light of the Manila Bulletin being the NAsHDC co-presenter.

In 2018, De La Salle University-Manila, in partnership with Unilab and Business Mirror, hosted NAsHDC again after a 7-year hiatus.

Aims
NAsHDC aims:

To HONE the potentials of the youth and unleash their talents;
To INCULCATE the value of critical thinking and awareness to the future leaders of our country;
To PROVIDE an avenue for academic discourse and cultural exchange amongst our youth;
To CONTRIBUTE to the social, cultural and intellectual growth of the nation’s young generations; and
To DEVELOP the youth’s English proficiency.

NAsHDC is part of a larger framework which is the Lasallian Education on Adjudication and Debate (LEAD). Under this program, LSDS envisions to educate Filipinos by spreading the culture of debating throughout the Philippines.

Tournament Format 
NAsHDC uses the Asian Parliamentary debate format. It is a 3-on-3 parliamentary debate style that was founded in 1994 in University of Tasmania, Hobart, Australia. There is a separate novice division in NAsHDC.

Past Champions and Grand finalists

Past Novice Champions

Past Best Speakers 

Schools debating competitions
Asian debating competitions